David V. Barrett is a British sociologist of religion who has widely written on topics pertaining to new religious movements and western esotericism. He is also a regular contributor to The Independent, Fortean Times, and the Catholic Herald.

Barrett received his PhD in the Sociology of Religion from the London School of Economics. The back flap of one of his books states he was an intelligence analyst for the UK Government Communications Headquarters and the United States' government's National Security Agency prior to his career as a writer.

He has been involved in science fiction critique, having edited Vector, the critical journal of the British Science Fiction Association in the late 1980s, and organized and chaired the Arthur C. Clarke Award for three years.

Bibliography
 Encyclopedia of Prediction: Fate, Fortune & Foretelling the Future, (1992); 
 Predictions Library - Dreams, (1995); 
 Predictions Library - Palmistry (1995)
 Predictions Library - Graphology (1995)
 Predictions Library - Numerology (1995)
The New Believers: Sects, Cults and Alternative Religions''''; (2001) A Brief History of Secret Societies: The Hidden Powers of Clandestine Organizations and Elites from the Ancient World to the Present Day (2007); 
 A Brief Guide to Secret Religions: A Complete Guide to Hermetic, Pagan, and Esoteric Beliefs'' (2011)

References

External links
 The New Believers book website

British male journalists
British sociologists
Place of birth missing (living people)
Year of birth missing (living people)
Living people